Amisk is a Cree word for beaver. Amisk may also refer to:
 Amisk Lake, an important lake in Saskatchewan on the main fur trade route
 Amisk Lake (Alberta), a small lake in the Beaver River Basin
 Amisk River, a river flowing from this lake
 Amisk, Alberta, a village unrelated to the two lakes
 Amiskwi River, a river in British Columbia (from the Cree word for Beavertail)
 Amiskwia, a fossil

Cree language